The National Alliance of College Summer Baseball consists of 12 summer baseball leagues sanctioned by the National Collegiate Athletic Association (NCAA).

Leagues
 Atlantic Collegiate Baseball League – Eastern Pennsylvania, Northern New Jersey, Staten Island 
 Cal Ripken Collegiate Baseball League – DC, Central Maryland, and Suburban Virginia
 California Collegiate League - The State of California from Orange County to Napa Valley
 Cape Cod Baseball League – Cape Cod area of Massachusetts
 Florida Collegiate Summer League – Orlando area
 Great Lakes Summer Collegiate League – Indiana,  Ohio, Michigan and Ontario 
 Hamptons Collegiate Baseball League – Eastern Long Island in New York
 New England Collegiate Baseball League – New England
 New York Collegiate Baseball League – Northwestern New York state
 Southern Collegiate Baseball League – Western North Carolina and Northwestern South Carolina (Charlotte, NC metro area)
 Sunbelt Baseball League – Metro Atlanta, Georgia
 Valley Baseball League – Central/Western Virginia

Most Valuable Program Award
Each year, the NACSB honors one or more college or university head coaches with the Most Valuable Program Award.

See also
Baseball awards #U.S. collegiate summer baseball

References

External links
NACSB official website

College baseball in the United States
Baseball governing bodies in the United States